Thorium(IV) chloride describes a family of inorganic compounds with the formula ThCl4(H2O)n.  Both the anhydrous and tetrahydrate (n = 4) forms are known.  They are hygroscopic, water-soluble white salts.

Structures 

The structure of thorium(IV) chloride features 8-coordinate Th centers with doubly bridging chloride ligands.

Synthesis 
ThCl4 was an intermediate in the original isolation of thorium metal by Jons Jacob Berzelius.

Thorium(IV) chloride can be produced in a variety of ways. One method is a carbothermic reaction, 700 °C to 2600 °C, involving thorium oxides and carbon in a stream of chlorine gas:
ThO2  +  2C  +  4Cl2  →  ThCl4  +  2CO

The chlorination reaction can be effected with carbon tetrachloride:
Th(C2O4)2  +  CCl4  →  ThCl4  +  3CO  +  3CO2

In another two-step method, thorium metal reacts with ammonium chloride:
Th  +  6NH4Cl →  (NH4)2ThCl6 + 4NH3  +  2H2
The hexachloride salt is then heated at 350 °C under a high vacuum to produce ThCl4.

Reactions
Lewis base adducts
ThCl4 reacts with Lewis bases to give molecular adducts, such as ThCl4(DME)2 and ThCl4(TMEDA)2.

Reduction to Th metal
Thorium(IV) chloride is an intermediate in the purification of thorium, which can be affected by:
Reduction of ThCl4 with alkali metals.
Electrolysis of anhydrous thorium(IV) chloride in fused mixture of NaCl and KCl.
Ca reduction of a mixture of ThCl4 with anhydrous zinc chloride.

References

Chlorides
Actinide halides
Thorium compounds